Morava was a Serbian brand of cigarettes which was owned and manufactured by Philip Morris Operations.

History
Morava was founded in the Socialist Republic of Serbia and named after the river Morava, whose circuit was the only way for almost all of the population of that time to get a cigarette. At that time, tobacco was forbidden, but after rioting, the government decided only to forbid the plant. After significant shortages, Morava was assigned a contract with the United Kingdom brand Phillip Morris to import pre-made cigarettes, which enabled Morava to have enough cigarettes for almost the whole country. The company used the same river for transport that it was named after. Morava was one of the best-selling brands within the Yugoslavian market, and was one of the few cigarette brands (along with Drina) to survive after the breakup of Yugoslavia. Morava's last variant of cigarette was eventually discontinued after 2005 due to poor sales.

Markets
Morava was sold in the following countries: Austria, Kingdom of Yugoslavia, Socialist Federal Republic of Yugoslavia, Socialist Republic of Slovenia, Socialist Republic of Bosnia and Herzegovina, Socialist Republic of Serbia and the Republic of Serbia (1992–2006).

See also

 Tobacco smoking

References

Cigarette brands